Cartoon Network is an American basic cable and satellite television channel that is part of The Cartoon Network, Inc. unit of the Warner Bros. Discovery Networks division of Warner Bros. Discovery which primarily focuses on animated programs.

1986–1992: Development 
On August 9, 1986, Ted Turner's Turner Broadcasting System acquired Metro-Goldwyn-Mayer/United Artists from Kirk Kerkorian; due to concerns over the debt load of his companies, on October 18, 1986, Turner was forced to sell MGM/UA back to Kerkorian after approximately only 75 days of ownership. However, Turner kept much of MGM's film and television library made before May 1986 (as well as some of the United Artists library) and formed Turner Entertainment Co.

On October 3, 1988, its cable channel Turner Network Television was launched and had gained an audience with its extensive film library. At this time, Turner's animation library included the MGM cartoon library, the pre-1948 color Looney Tunes and Merrie Melodies shorts, the Harman-Ising Merrie Melodies shorts (except Lady, Play Your Mandolin!), and the Fleischer Studios/Famous Studios Popeye cartoons.

In 1991, Turner beat out bidders including MCA Inc. (then-owner of Universal Studios) and Hallmark Cards when it made a deal to purchase the library of animation studio Hanna-Barbera for $320 million. Ted Turner selected Betty Cohen, then-Senior Vice President of TNT, to devise a network that would house these programs. On February 18, 1992, Turner Broadcasting announced its plans to launch Cartoon Network as an outlet for Turner's considerable library of animation.

1992–2004: Checkerboard and Powerhouse eras

1992–2001 

On October 1, 1992, Cartoon Network launched to the finale of Tchaikovsky's 1812 Overture with a backdrop of cartoon explosions, followed by a special event called Droopy's Guide to the Cartoon Network hosted by the Metro-Goldwyn-Mayer's Tom & Jerry cartoon character Droopy, during which the first cartoon on the network, Rhapsody Rabbit, was shown. Initial programming on the channel consisted exclusively of reruns of Warner Bros. cartoons (the pre-1948 Looney Tunes and Merrie Melodies), the 1933–1957 Popeye cartoons, MGM cartoons, and Hanna-Barbera cartoons. At first, cable providers in Atlanta, Boston, Chicago, Cincinnati, Columbus, OH, Los Angeles, Miami, New York City, Philadelphia, Washington, D.C., Dallas, and Detroit carried the channel. By the time the network launched, Cartoon Network had an 8,500-hour cartoon library. From its launch until 1995, the network's announcers said the network's name with the word "The" added before "Cartoon Network," thus calling the network "The Cartoon Network."

Cartoon Network was not the first cable channel to have relied on cartoons to attract an audience, however, it was the first 24-hour single-genre channel with animation as its main theme. Turner Broadcasting System had defied conventional wisdom before by launching CNN, a channel providing 24-hour news coverage. The concept was previously thought unlikely to attract a sufficient audience to be particularly profitable, however the CNN experiment had been successful and Turner hoped that Cartoon Network would also find success.

Initially, the channel would broadcast cartoons 24 hours a day. Most of the short cartoons were aired in half-hour or hour-long packages, usually separated by character or studio – Down Wit' Droopy D aired old Droopy Dog shorts, The Tom and Jerry Show presented the classic cat-and-mouse team, and Bugs and Daffy Tonight provided classic Looney Tunes shorts. Late Night Black and White showed early black-and-white cartoons (mostly from the Fleischer Studios and Walter Lantz cartoons from the 1930s, as well as black-and-white Merrie Melodies and MGM cartoons), and ToonHeads would show three shorts with a similar theme and provide trivia about the cartoons. There was also an afternoon cartoon block called High Noon Toons, which was hosted by cowboy hand puppets (an example of the simplicity and imagination the network had in its early years). The majority of the classic animation that was shown on Cartoon Network no longer airs on a regular basis, but Tom and Jerry and Looney Tunes continued to air up until 2017.

A challenge for Cartoon Network was to overcome its low penetration of existing cable systems. When launched on October 1, 1992, the channel was only carried by 233 cable systems. However, it benefited from package deals. New subscribers to sister channels TNT and TBS could also get access to Cartoon Network through such deals. The high ratings of Cartoon Network over the following couple of years led to more cable systems including it. By the end of 1994, Cartoon Network had become "the fifth most popular cable channel in the United States."

For the first few years of Cartoon Network's existence, programming meant for the channel would also air on TBS and/or TNT, both of which were still full-service cable networks that carried a variety of different programming genera, in order to increase the shows' (and Cartoon Network's) exposure; examples include The Real Adventures of Jonny Quest, Cartoon Planet, SWAT Kats: The Radical Squadron, and 2 Stupid Dogs.

The network's first exclusive original show was The Moxy Show, an animation anthology series first airing in 1993. The first series produced by Cartoon Network was Space Ghost Coast to Coast in 1994, but the show mostly consisted of "recycled animation cells" from the archives of Hanna-Barbera, being an ironic deconstruction of a talk show. It featured live-action guests, mostly consisting of celebrities which were past their prime or counterculture figures. A running gag was that the production cost was dubbed "minimal". The series found its audience among young adults who appreciated its "hip" perspective.

Kevin Sandler considered Space Ghost Coast to Coast instrumental in establishing Cartoon Network's appeal to older audiences. Space Ghost, a 1960s superhero by Hanna-Barbera, was recast as the star of a talk show spoof. This was arguably the first time the network revived a "classic animated icon" in an entirely new context for comedic purposes. Grown-ups who had ceased enjoying the original takes on the characters could find amusement in the "new ironic and self-referential context" for them. Promotional shorts such as the "Scooby-Doo Project," a parody of The Blair Witch Project, gave similar treatments to the Scooby gang. However, there were less successful efforts at such revivals. A Day in the Life of Ranger Smith and Boo Boo Runs Wild (1999) were short cartoons featuring new takes on Yogi Bear's supporting cast by John Kricfalusi. Their style of humor, sexual content, and break in tone from the source material was rather out of place among the rest of the Cartoon Network shows, and the network rarely found a place for them in its programming.

In 1994, Hanna-Barbera's new division Cartoon Network Studios was founded and started production on What a Cartoon! (also known as World Premiere Toons and Cartoon Cartoons). This show debuted in 1995, offering original animated shorts commissioned from Hanna-Barbera and various independent animators. The network promoted the series as an attempt to return to the "classic days" of studio animation, offering full animator control, high budgets, and no limited animation. The project was spearheaded by Cartoon Network executives, plus John Kricfalusi and Fred Seibert. Kricfalusi was the creator of The Ren & Stimpy Show and served as an advisor to the network, while Seibert was formerly one of the driving forces behind Nickelodeon's Nicktoons and would go on to produce the similar animation anthology series Oh Yeah! Cartoons and Random! Cartoons.

Cartoon Network was able to assess the potential of certain shorts to serve as pilots for spin-off series and signed contracts with their creators to create ongoing series. Dexter's Laboratory was the most popular short series according to a vote held in 1995 and eventually became the first spin-off of What a Cartoon! in 1996. Three more series based on shorts debuted from 1997 to 1999: Johnny Bravo, Cow and Chicken, I Am Weasel (the latter two as segments of the same show; I Am Weasel was later spun off into a separate show), The Powerpuff Girls, Courage the Cowardly Dog, and Mike, Lu & Og. The unrelated series Ed, Edd n Eddy also premiered in 1999, creating a line-up of critically acclaimed shows. Many of these series premiered bearing the "Cartoon Cartoons" brand, airing throughout the network's schedule and prominently on Cartoon Cartoon Fridays, which became the marquee night for premieres of new episodes and series beginning on June 11, 1999.

These original series were intended to appeal to a wider audience than the average Saturday-morning cartoon. Linda Simensky, vice president of original animation, reminded adults and teenage girls that cartoons could appeal to them as well. Kevin Sandler's article of them claimed that these cartoons were both less "bawdy" than their counterparts at Comedy Central and less "socially responsible" than their counterparts at Nickelodeon. Sandler pointed to the whimsical rebelliousness, high rate of exaggeration and self-consciousness of the overall output each individual series managed.

In 1995, Cartoon Network launched "Cartoon Network Online" as an America Online exclusive website. It would later merge with ghostplanet.com as simply "CartoonNetwork.com", and featured games, videos, shopping, and Cartoon Orbit (which launched in 2000), as well as promotions for movies, video games, food items, toys, etc. such as Campbell's Soup, Ice Age, the original Spy Kids trilogy, The Cat in the Hat, Juicy Drop Pop, Wonder Ball, Hot Wheels, and more. In addition, CartoonNetwork.com also ran Cartoon Network's first online original series Web Premiere Toons, which mostly featured interactive web cartoons that ran from 1999 to 2002.

Starting in 1996, Cartoon Network aired two preschool programs on Sunday mornings: Big Bag, a live-action/puppet television program with animated short series produced by Children's Television Workshop, and Small World, which featured animated series aimed at preschoolers imported from foreign countries. Big Bag ran until 2001, and Small World ran until 2002.

In 1996, Turner Broadcasting System merged with Time Warner (ironically, Time Warner's predecessor Warner Communications helped launch rival Nickelodeon as Pinwheel in 1977, now owned by Paramount Media Networks). The merger consolidated ownership of all the Warner Bros. cartoons, allowing the post-July 1948 and the former Sunset-owned black-and-white cartoons (which Warner Bros. had reacquired in the 1960s) releases to be shown on the network. As most of the post-July 1948 cartoons were still contracted to be shown on Nickelodeon and ABC, the network would not air them until September 1999 (from Nickelodeon) and October 2000 (from ABC), however, the majority of the post-July 1948 cartoons that were shown on its now-sibling broadcast network The WB's Kids' WB block began airing on Cartoon Network in January 1997. Newer animated productions by Warner Bros. Animation also started appearing on the network – mostly reruns of shows that had aired on Kids' WB and some from Fox Kids, along with certain new programs such as Justice League.

Cartoon Network's programming would not be available in Canada until 1996 when Dexter's Laboratory and The Real Adventures of Jonny Quest began airing on Canadian specialty channel YTV. Teletoon and its French-language counterpart shortly thereafter became the primary Canadian home of Cartoon Network programs, with YTV picking up a few into the mid-2000s.

In 1997, Cartoon Network launched a new action block entitled Toonami. Its lineup initially consisted of 1980s reruns of Robotech and ThunderCats. However, new shows were introduced and they consisted of action cartoons and anime, such as Sailor Moon, Tenchi Muyo!, Mobile Suit Gundam Wing, and Dragon Ball Z. Toonami was hosted by Moltar from the Space Ghost franchise until 1999, where Toonami was later hosted by its own original character, a muscular teenage robot named TOM. On March 2, 1998, a series of bumpers featuring the instrumental Powerhouse were introduced. These bumpers lasted from 1998 to 2004.

One new original series premiered in 2000: Sheep in the Big City. On April 1, 2000, Cartoon Network launched a digital cable and satellite channel known as Boomerang, which was spun off from one of their programming blocks that featured retro animated series and shorts.

Three new original series premiered in 2001: Time Squad, Samurai Jack, and Grim & Evil. On June 18, 2001, Betty Cohen, who had served as Cartoon Network's president since its founding, left due to creative disagreements with Jamie Kellner, then-head of Turner Broadcasting.

2001–2004 
On August 22, 2001, Jim Samples was appointed general manager and Executive Vice President of the network, replacing Cohen. Adult Swim debuted on September 2, 2001, with an episode of Home Movies, the block initially aired on Sunday nights, with a repeat telecast on Thursdays. The initial lineup consisted of Harvey Birdman: Attorney at Law, Sealab 2021, Cowboy Bebop, The Brak Show, Aqua Teen Hunger Force, and Space Ghost Coast to Coast.

In 2002, Whatever Happened to... Robot Jones? and Codename: Kids Next Door premiered; the former was short-lived, but the latter became a juggernaut for the network in the mid-2000s. The first theatrical film based on an original Cartoon Network series, The Powerpuff Girls Movie, was released on July 3, 2002. Although it was a commercial failure at the time of its release, grossing $16.4 million worldwide on a budget of $11 million, it did receive some positive reviews from critics. On October 1 of that year, Cartoon Network celebrated their tenth anniversary, with a montage showcasing the network's various phases over the years.

2003 saw the debuts of The Grim Adventures of Billy & Mandy and Evil Con Carne, both spinoffs of Grim & Evil. The network started to drop the "Cartoon Cartoons" brand from its original programming and ended the Cartoon Cartoon Fridays block on May 16, 2003. On October 3, 2003, the Cartoon Cartoon Fridays block was rebooted in a live-action format as "Fridays", hosted by Tommy Snider and Nzinga Blake, the latter of which was later replaced by Tara Sands in 2005. It aired episodes of Cartoon Network original series and acquired shows alongside movies and specials. Acquired shows started picking up again with Totally Spies! debuting this year.

2004–2009: CN City, Yes, Fall, and Noods eras

2004–2007 
In 2004, Cartoon Network premiered three new original series: Megas XLR, Foster's Home for Imaginary Friends, and Hi Hi Puffy AmiYumi along with the acquired series Code Lyoko. On June 14, 2004, Cartoon Network rebranded, which included an updated version of its original logo (with the checkerboard motif retained and the "C" and "N" being the centerpiece) and a new slogan, "This is Cartoon Network!" The bumpers introduced as part of the rebrand featured 2D cartoon characters from its shows interacting in a CGI city composed of sets from their shows. These bumpers lasted from 2004 to 2007. By now, nearly all of Cartoon Network's classic programming had been relocated to its sister network Boomerang to make way for new programming.

2005 saw the debuts of two more original series: The Life and Times of Juniper Lee and Camp Lazlo. On August 22, 2005, Cartoon Network launched a block aimed at the preschool demographic known as Tickle-U; shows on the block included Gordon the Garden Gnome, Yoko! Jakamoko! Toto!, Harry and His Bucket Full of Dinosaurs, Little Robots, Peppa Pig, Firehouse Tales, and Gerald McBoing-Boing. The block was largely unsuccessful and was discontinued on January 13, 2006. From 2005 to 2008, most of the network's older Cartoon Cartoons (such as Dexter's Laboratory and The Powerpuff Girls) could be viewed in segments on a half-hour block known as The Cartoon Cartoon Show.

In 2005, Cartoon Network signed a deal with AMC Theatres for Summer MovieCamp to feature episodes of Hi Hi Puffy AmiYumi, Camp Lazlo, The Grim Adventures of Billy & Mandy, Codename: Kids Next Door, and Foster's Home for Imaginary Friends in the big screen.

After its predecessor, What a Cartoon!, Cartoon Network created an all-new animated short series consisting of overseas shorts, pilots, college shorts, or even shorts created for the show itself. That show was called Sunday Pants; it first aired on the day of October 2, 2005. Sunday Pants varies on different types of animation, from traditional hand-drawn animation to Flash, or even CGI, possibly making it similar to other shows such as Liquid Television on MTV or KaBlam! on its competitor channel Nickelodeon. The show was created by Craig "Sven" Gordon and Stuart Hill, and was produced at Spitfire Studios. The show has a similar concept to What a Cartoon!, except that the shorts are 1–3 minutes long and the show is squeezed to be 23 minutes (without commercials). There are animated and live-action intervals in-between shorts. The live-action ones are performed by American band The Slacks, while the animated ones are animated by WeFail. The show lasted for less than a month, with its final airing taking place on October 30, 2005. In January 2006, the show was announced to be returning the month after but said return never came to fruition and the series was ultimately cancelled.

Four new Cartoon Network originals and one internationally acquired series premiered in 2006: Ben 10, My Gym Partner's a Monkey, Squirrel Boy, Class of 3000, and Robotboy.  Three made-for-TV movies debuted this year: Codename: Kids Next Door – Operation Z.E.R.O., Foster's Home for Imaginary Friends: Good Wilt Hunting, and Re-Animated, the latter of which was the network's first live-action TV movie and a collaboration between live-action and animation.

Samples resigned from his post on February 9, 2007, following a bomb scare in Boston caused by packages left around the city that were part of an outdoor marketing campaign promoting the Adult Swim series Aqua Teen Hunger Force.

2007–2009  
On May 2, 2007, Stuart Snyder was named Samples' successor. On September 14, 2007, the network's look was revamped, with bumpers and station IDs themed to The Hives song "Fall Is Just Something That Grown-Ups Invented." 2007 saw the debut of Out of Jimmy's Head, a spin-off of the movie Re-Animated, and the first live-action Cartoon Network series. 2007 also saw the debut of the series Chowder. In late 2007, the network began broadcasting programs from Canadian channels such as YTV and Teletoon, including George of the Jungle, 6teen, Storm Hawks, League of Super Evil, Chaotic, Bakugan Battle Brawlers, Stoked, and the Total Drama series. Each October from 2007 to 2009, Cartoon Network also re-ran 40 episodes of the former Fox Kids series Goosebumps.

Cartoon Network announced at its 2008 upfront that it was working on a new project called The Cartoonstitute, which was headed by animators Craig McCracken as executive producer and Rob Renzetti as supervising producer. Both reported to Rob Sorcher, who created the idea. It would have worked similar to What a Cartoon!, by creating at least 150 pieces of animation within 20 months. Cartoonstitute was eventually cancelled, and out of all the shorts, two or three, Regular Show, Secret Mountain Fort Awesome and Uncle Grandpa, were selected, after animator Craig McCracken (creator of The Powerpuff Girls and Foster's Home for Imaginary Friends) left the network after 15 years in 2009. On September 20, 2008, Cartoon Network ended Toonami after its 11-year run. From 2008 to 2010, Cartoon Network aired animated shorts that served as interstitials between programs, called Wedgies, which included Big Baby, The Bremen Avenue Experience, Calling Cat-22, Nacho Bear, Roller Squirrels and The Talented Mr. Bixby. On July 14, 2008, the network took on a refreshed look created by Tristan Eaton and animated by Crew972. The bumpers of that era had white, faceless characters called Noods, based on the DIY toy, Munny. These characters had many variations that made them look like characters from different CN shows. The standard network logo was changed to be white, adopting different colors based on the occasion in the same style.

In June 2009, Cartoon Network introduced a block of live-action reality shows called "CN Real", featuring programs such as The Othersiders, Survive This, BrainRush, Destroy Build Destroy, Dude, What Would Happen, and Bobb'e Says. Survive This was a Canadian reality series that was imported from YTV, making it the only Canadian import to be part of the lineup. The network also aired some limited sports programming, including basketball recaps and Slamball games, during commercial breaks. The lineup was universally panned for being live-action shows on a channel dedicated to cartoons. That year, it also started airing live-action feature films from Warner Bros. and New Line Cinema.

On 2009, production for the third logo and "CHECK it" era were started. The first prototype for the third logo and CHECK it era were designed by Qube Konstrukt but it was unused. A second prototype was created in early 2010 where it has similarities with the final version. The third and final version of the logo as well as the said era, designed by Brand New School, was then unveiled on the network's 2010 upfront in April 21, 2010, one month before the 2010 logo officially started to be used on May 29, 2010.

2010–2021: CHECK it, Dimensional, Mashup

2010–2016 

On May 29, 2010, a new brand identity was officially introduced, along with new bumpers, a theme, and a tagline, "CHECK it." The branding consists of the black and white checkerboard which formed the network's first logo (and was carried over in a minimized form to the second logo), as well as various CMYK color variations and various patterns. On December 27, 2010, Adult Swim expanded by one hour, moving its start time from 10:00 p.m. to 9:00 p.m. ET. In February 2011, Cartoon Network aired its first sports award show Hall of Game Awards, hosted that year by professional skateboarder Tony Hawk. The first series produced by Cartoon Network Studios to be broadcast in high definition was Adventure Time.

At its 2011 upfront, Cartoon Network announced 12 new series, including The Problem Solverz (originally planned for Adult Swim but switched to CN for being "too cute"), The Amazing World of Gumball, The Looney Tunes Show, Secret Mountain Fort Awesome, Level Up (a scripted live-action comedy series with a 90-minute precursor film), Tower Prep, Green Lantern, DreamWorks Dragons (a series based on the DreamWorks film How to Train Your Dragon), Total Drama: Revenge of the Island, the 4th season of Total Drama, ThunderCats, Ninjago: Masters of Spinjitzu, and Ben 10: Omniverse. The network announced it planned to debut a new programming block called DC Nation which would focus on the DC superheroes, the first being the series Green Lantern.

After announcing two new live-action shows in Unnatural History and Tower Prep, which were both cancelled after their first seasons, Cartoon Network acquired the game show, Hole in the Wall (originally aired on Fox). By the end of 2011, Hole in the Wall and the final two CN Real shows, Destroy Build Destroy and Dude, What Would Happen? were removed from Cartoon Network's schedule completely. In 2012, Cartoon Network acquired the television rights to The High Fructose Adventures of Annoying Orange, based on the web series, The Annoying Orange and added it to its primetime lineup.

On February 2, 2012, Corus Entertainment and Astral Media, owners of Teletoon, announced they would launch a Canadian version of Cartoon Network that also includes a version of the U.S. network's Adult Swim nighttime block. The channel launched on July 4, 2012. The following month, March 2012, Cartoon Network aired its first documentary, Speak Up, an anti-bullying campaign featuring a special appearance by President Barack Obama. On October 1, 2012, Cartoon Network celebrated its 20th anniversary, airing birthday and party-themed reruns of its shows for several days. Earlier in the year on March 30, 2012, the Cartoon Planet block was revived to air the channel's original programming from the late 1990s through mid-2000s. In addition, the channel announced new programming for 2013, including the live-action series Incredible Crew; the animated series Teen Titans Go!, Uncle Grandpa, Steven Universe, I Heart Tuesdays (which never went through production), Mixels, Clarence, Total Drama: All-Stars, Grojband, Beware the Batman, The Tom and Jerry Show, and Legends of Chima; and a new Powerpuff Girls special, the latter of which aired on January 20, 2014.

On May 20, 2013, Cartoon Network updated its identity by adding new bumpers, graphics, and sounds. A short animation was created for each show, and these animations were used when featuring the show in Next bumpers. The background used in its promos and bumpers was also changed from black to white. On April 28, 2013, the network aired the CNN half-hour documentary The Bully Effect, which details the story of teenager Alex Libby and his struggle with bullying in high school. The special is based on the 2011 film Bully directed by Lee Hirsch.

On March 6, 2014, Stuart Snyder was removed as president and COO of Turner's Animation, Young Adults & Kids Media division after a restructure. On July 16, Christina Miller was named his successor as president and general manager of Cartoon Network, Adult Swim, and Boomerang. At the end of the month, Cartoon Network's 8pm ET/PT primetime hour was given to its night time block Adult Swim, causing new episodes of the network's programming to change time slots. On October 21, 2014, Cartoon Network, along with CNN and Boomerang, were taken off-air from US-based TV provider, Dish Network, due to contract disagreements. However, the channels were restored a month later.

2016–2021
On May 30, 2016, Cartoon Network refreshed its on-air presentation with a new graphics package based on previous rebrands in the CHECK It family. Known as "Dimensional", the branding was developed by Bent Design Lab and featured various Cartoon Network characters rendered in 3D CGI, stop-motion, and 2D animation. Branding and marketing agency Troika developed the Dimensional style guide, a set of channel-wide standards.

On October 22, 2016, AT&T reached a deal to acquire Time Warner for $108.7 billion. The merger was approved by federal regulators on June 12, 2018, and the merger was completed 2 days later, with Time Warner's name changed to WarnerMedia. To celebrate the network's 25th anniversary, Cartoon Network announced an exhibit called "Cartoon Network: 25 Years of Drawing on Creativity" in partnership with the Paley Center, with showings from September 16. 2017 to October 8, 2017, in their New York City location, and moved to their Beverly Hills, California location with showings from October 14 to November 19 of that year.

On January 26, 2018, the network announced plans to launch a new cruise ship, in partnership between Turner Broadcasting and Oceanic Group. The ship, Cartoon Network Wave, embarked on its maiden voyage in late 2018. On October 29, 2018, Cartoon Network announced construction of its first amusement hotel in Lancaster County, Pennsylvania, which opened on January 10, 2020. The company is working with Palace Entertainment to "offer fun and unexpected ways to experience the animated worlds of Cartoon Network from the moment of arrival," according to current president Christina Miller.

On March 4, 2019, AT&T announced a major reorganization of WarnerMedia's Turner Broadcasting division, which involves Cartoon Network, Boomerang, Adult Swim and Turner Classic Movies being transferred to Warner Bros. Entertainment. Although AT&T did not specify any timetable for the changes to take effect, WarnerMedia had begun to remove all Turner references in corporate communications and press releases, referring to that unit's networks as "divisions of WarnerMedia".

On November 27, 2019, it was announced that Christina Miller would be leaving WarnerMedia at the end of 2019. Michael Ouweleen served as interim president of Cartoon Network, with Miller helping with the transition.

On April 7, 2020, it was announced that effective July 1, Tom Ascheim would become President of Warner Bros. Global Kids, Young Adults and Classics, overseeing Cartoon Network, Boomerang, Adult Swim, and Turner Classic Movies.

On September 8, 2020, Cartoon Network released a Back to School PSA worldwide titled "In This Together" featuring characters from Teen Titans Go! and children from around the world talking about how school will be this year.

2021–present: Warner Bros. Discovery (Redraw Your World and Pastel eras) 
In February 2021, Ascheim revealed plans for Cartoon Network to introduce new programming blocks targeting preschool and family viewing respectively, as part of an effort to expand the channel's demographic reach. During the WarnerMedia upfronts, it was announced that the preschool brand Cartoonito would launch in the U.S. via a block on Cartoon Network and a branded hub on WarnerMedia's streaming service HBO Max. Over 20 series were expected to be featured at its launch. Cartoon Network also unveiled a new imaging campaign, "Redraw Your World".  Cartoonito launched in September 2021, alongside the new Sunday evening block "ACME Night"—which primarily features airings of family films, and other original specials and animated made-for-TV movies.

On May 17, 2021, AT&T announced an agreement for WarnerMedia to be divested and merge with Discovery Inc., forming Warner Bros. Discovery under CEO David Zaslav. The merger was completed in April 2022. Cartoon Network has faced a number of cuts and reorganizations associated with the merger; in May 2022, Ascheim stepped down as president of Warner Bros. Global Kids, Young Adults and Classics, which was subsequently shut down and folded into Warner Bros. Television. The Cartoon Network, Inc. channels would soon be placed under the refined Warner Bros. Discovery Networks division (succeeding the defunct Tuner Broadcasting System).

Michael Ouweleen was then reinstated as president of Cartoon Network and its sister properties. In August 2022, a number of Cartoon Network-originated programs were removed from HBO Max by WBD as part of cost-cutting measures and write-offs of underperforming content, leading to criticism from fans and the animation industry. In October, Cartoon Network Studios merged its development and production operations into Warner Bros. Animation, while continuing to exist as an imprint. On October 1, 2022, Cartoon Network celebrated its 30th anniversary of the network, with airings of its classic shows at the beginning and end of the day, and hosted a livestream on YouTube showcasing its shows, along with some classic commercials and bumpers from the channel.

Beginning September 3, 2022, Cartoon Network began celebrating the 30th anniversary of the network debut. A new weeknight block started on September 7 which airs episodes of Adventure Time and Regular Show during the 6pm hour and various Cartoon Network original series during the 7pm hour.

On October 14, 2022, Cartoon Network addressed speculation that the channel was shutting down, stating that they were "not dead", and "have been and will always be your home for beloved, innovative cartoons". The network's Latin American station (including its Brazilian feed) also posted a similar thread about two weeks later.

In a December 2022 interview with Variety, Ouweleen foretold Cartoon Network returning to its initial roots as an "animation network" rather than a "kid network", as well as the possibility of producing more programming that could appeal to both children and young adults. "We have to allocate the money we have in ways that we think are going to have the biggest impact and please the most number of people. You want to keep those creative relationships with people and see what else you can do", he explained.

References

Bibliography 

 
 

Cartoon Network
Cartoon Network
Cartoon Network
Cartoon Network
Cartoon Network
Cartoon Network
Cartoon Network
Children's television in the United States